Harold F. Mowery Jr. (January 4, 1930 – March 3, 2014) was a Republican member of the Pennsylvania State Senate. He also represented the 87th legislative district in the Pennsylvania House of Representatives from 1977 to 1990.

Mowery graduated from Mechanicsburg High School. He graduated from Dickinson College with degrees in economics and psychology before entering the insurance business in 1954. He earned a chartered life underwriter (CLU) degree in 1966.

He died of pneumonia in 2014 at his home in Camp Hill.

References

External links
 - official PA Senate profile (archived)
 - official Party website (archived)

1930 births
2014 deaths
Republican Party Pennsylvania state senators
Republican Party members of the Pennsylvania House of Representatives
People from Shippensburg, Pennsylvania
Dickinson College alumni
Businesspeople from Pennsylvania
Deaths from pneumonia in Pennsylvania
20th-century American businesspeople